Ecteninion is an extinct genus of meat-eating cynodonts that lived during the Late Triassic (Carnian) in South America. The type species Ecteninion lunensis was named by R.N. Martinez, C.L. May, and C.A. Forster in 1996. It was found in the Cancha de Bochas Member of the Ischigualasto Formation in the Ischigualasto-Villa Unión Basin in northwestern Argentina. It has been interpreted as a basal eucynodont. The holotype is in the collection of the Universidad Nacional de San Juan.

References

Further reading 
 Martinez et al. (1996) "A new carnivorous cynodont from the Ischigualasto formation (Late Triassic, Argentina), with comments on eucynodont phylogeny." J. Vertebr. Paleontol. 16(2), p. 271-284.

Prehistoric probainognathians
Prehistoric cynodont genera
Carnian genera
Late Triassic synapsids of South America
Triassic Argentina
Fossils of Argentina
Ischigualasto Formation
Fossil taxa described in 1996
Taxa named by Catherine Forster